is a Japanese politician who served as the fifth Governor of Okinawa from 1998 until 2006. He studied at, and graduated from, Keio University.

References 

1933 births
Japanese politicians
Japanese people of Chinese descent
People from Okinawa Island
People from Okinawa Prefecture
Governors of Okinawa Prefecture
Keio University alumni
Living people